Mofti Kola (also Romanized as Moftī Kolā) is a village in Mazkureh Rural District, in the Central District of Sari County, Mazandaran Province, Iran. At the 2006 census, its population was 506, in 130 families.

References 

Populated places in Sari County